The 2015–16 Butler Bulldogs men's basketball team represented Butler University in the 2015–16 NCAA Division I men's basketball season. Their head coach was Chris Holtmann, serving his second year. The Bulldogs played their home games at Hinkle Fieldhouse, which has a capacity of approximately 9,100. This was Butler's third season in the Big East Conference. They finished the season 22–11, 10–8 in Big East play to finish in a tie for fourth place. They lost in the quarterfinals of the Big East tournament to Providence. The Bulldogs received an at-large bid to the NCAA tournament where they defeated Texas Tech in the first round to advance to the second round where they lost to Virginia.

Previous season 
The Bulldogs finished the 2014–15 season with a record of 23–11, 12–6 in Big East play to finish in a tie for second place. Butler received an at-large bid to the NCAA tournament as a #6 seed and defeated Texas in the second round before losing in the Third Round to Notre Dame.

Off season
With starting point guard Alex Barlow graduating in May 2015, Butler needed to add some depth in the guard position to back up Kellen Dunham and Tyler Lewis, who will be coming off of a redshirt season in 2014–15 due to transfer rules. On March 29, 2015, Jordan Gathers, a 6'3" combo guard from St. Bonaventure in the Atlantic 10 Conference announced his commitment to Butler after sitting out a season due to a hip injury. Barely a week and a half later, Butler gained another transfer from the Atlantic 10, this time in Kethan Savage from George Washington University. Savage, a 6'3" guard, will have to sit out a year per NCAA transfer regulations and will be available for the 2016–17 season. Gathers completed his degree at St. Bonaventure in three and a half years and therefore is immediately eligible to play.

There were also some changes in the coaching staff in the off season. On April 27, Butler announced the hire of Ryan Pedon, former assistant to Illinois head coach (and former Butler assistant) John Groce, as an assistant coach. Emerson Kampen, who was promoted to an assistant coaching position following Chris Holtmann's appointment as interim HC, was named Butler's new basketball analyst for the 2014-15 season.

Another major change occurred in August when it was announced that the playing surface in Hinkle Fieldhouse — the oldest playing surface still in use in the NCAA — was being sanded down to prepare for the new Bulldog logo at center court. The new design does not include the word "Butler" underneath the bulldog, and replaces the word "Bulldogs" on both end lines with "Butler." Also, the home sideline will have "Hinkle Fieldhouse" painted on it.

Departures

2015 recruiting class

Roster

Schedule

|-
!colspan=12 style="background:#11284B; color:#FFFFFF;"| Exhibition

|-
!colspan=12 style="background:#11284B; color:#FFFFFF;"| Non-conference regular season

|-
!colspan=12 style="background:#11284B; color:#FFFFFF;"| Big East Conference Play

|-
!colspan=12 style="background:#11284B; color:#FFFFFF;"| Big East tournament

|-
!colspan=12 style="background:#11284B; color:#FFFFFF;"| NCAA tournament

Rankings

Awards

References

Butler
Butler Bulldogs men's basketball seasons
Butler
Butler
Butler